Matteo Serrotti (born 1 November 1986) is an Italian footballer who plays as a midfielder for Athletic Carpi.

Club career
Serrotti made his professional, Lega Pro debut in the Prato in the first round of 2013–14 Lega Pro, on 1 September 2013 against L'Aquila, playing 90 minutes. He signed to Arezzo in 2018.

On 5 July 2019, he signed with Siena.

On 31 January 2020, he joined Reggio Audace on a 1.5-year contract. However, his contract was terminated in October 2020.

On 4 January 2021, he returned to Arezzo.

On 15 September 2021, he joined Athletic Carpi in Serie D.

References

External links
 
 

1986 births
Living people
Footballers from Florence
Association football midfielders
Italian footballers
Scandicci Calcio players
A.C. Perugia Calcio players
A.C. Prato players
A.C. Tuttocuoio 1957 San Miniato players
S.S.D. Correggese Calcio 1948 players
S.S. Arezzo players
A.C.N. Siena 1904 players
A.C. Reggiana 1919 players
Serie C players
Serie D players